Gabriel Pogrund is a journalist who is currently Whitehall editor at The Sunday Times.

He graduated with a BA in Geography from University College London in 2016.

He won 2017 Young Journalist of the Year at the British Press Awards and in 2018 was a Stern Fellow at The Washington Post. In 2020 Pogrund and Patrick Maguire published Left Out: The Inside Story of Labour Under Corbyn. In 2021 Pogrund and John Collingridge won a British Journalism Award for anti-corruption journalism for their reporting on the Greensill scandal. In 2022 he made the shortlist for the Paul Foot Award, for reporting on how Prince Charles' household had allegedly promised honours in exchange for donations to the Prince's charities.

References

British journalists
Year of birth missing (living people)
Living people
Alumni of University College London
Place of birth missing (living people)
The Sunday Times people